Lai Shi, China's Last Eunuch, also known as Last Eunuch in China, (Chinese: 中國最後一個太監) is a 1988 Hong Kong historical drama film directed by Jacob Cheung in his directorial debut and starring Max Mok in the title role of Liu Lai-shi. The film is based on Ni Kuang's novel about eunuch Sun Yaoting.

Plot
During the chaos of the late Qing Dynasty, Liu Lai-shi (Max Mok) envies the glory of his fellow townsman and eunuch Siu-tak-cheung and asks his parents for purification. Soon, the Qing dynasty collapses, Liu failed to become an imperial eunuch and was sent to Beijing to study opera. Subsequently, he meets his childhood friend Chiu Tai (Irene Wan). Liu intends to lead a normal family life, but unable to do so after his identity of a eunuch was exposed. The opera troupe leader (Sammo Hung) sympathizes Liu's life experiences and tried to arrange him to the palace to be China's last eunuch. In 1924, Xuantong Emperor was expelled from the Forbidden City and Liu also began his wandering career.

Cast
Max Mok as Liu Lai-shi, the main protagonist, China's last eunuch
Irene Wan as Chiu Tai, Liu Lai-shi's childhood friend
Sammo Hung as Liu Lai-shi's teacher, the opera troupe leader (guest star)
Andy Lau as Han Ming, Chiu Tai's husband and a revolutionary (guest star)
Wu Ma as Lord Ting, the head eunuch (guest star)
Lam Ching-ying as Liu Chang-fu, Liu Lai-shi's father (guest star)
Gua Ah-leh as Liu Lai-shi's mother
Pauline Wong as Sister Hung, a prostitute
Manfred Wong as Eunuch Lee
Peter Mak
Alfred Cheung as the district chief
Anthony Chan as a Japanese interpreter
James Tien as General Lei
Sit Hon as Lord Chao
Sihung Lung as Fu's landlord
Ng Min-kan, Yuen Miu, Chow Kam-kong and Pang Yun-cheung as opera troupe members
Lee Chi-kit as a Japanese soldier
Vincent Chiao as Adjutant

Theme song
Misconception (錯覺)
Composer: Joseph Koo
Lyricist: Cheng Kwok-kong
Singer: Andy Lau

Box office
The film grossed HK$15,624,171 at the Hong Kong box office during its theatrical run from 4 March to 31 March 1988 in Hong Kong.

Accolades

External links

Lai Shi, China's Last Eunuch at Hong Kong Cinemagic

1988 films
1980s historical drama films
Hong Kong historical drama films
1980s Cantonese-language films
Films directed by Jacob Cheung
Films set in 20th-century Qing dynasty
Films set in Beijing
Films set in the 1920s
Golden Harvest films
1988 directorial debut films
1988 drama films
1980s Hong Kong films